Ivan Terentyevich Peresypkin (June 5, 1904 in the Oryol Oblast – October 12, 1978 in Moscow) was a Soviet General, statesman and wartime leader.

Career 
He was the People's Commissar of Signal Corps of the USSR From May 1939 to July 1944. During the Great Patriotic War he served concurrently as Deputy People's Commissar of Defence of the USSR – chief of the Main Communication Directorate of the Red Army. From November 1944, he was chief of the Main Communication Directorate of the Red Army and Marshal of the signal troops. During the war, he displayed talent for military leadership. He did a great amount of work ensuring stable communications between the Supreme Command Headquarters, the General Staff, and the combat army. He made a tangible contribution to the development and manufacture of various communications devices and helped supply them to the front.

Awards
He was awarded many orders and medals over the course of his career:

Order of Lenin (four times)
Order of the October Revolution
Order of the Red Banner (two times)
Order of Kutuzov
Order of the Red Star
Order "For Service to the Homeland in the Armed Forces of the USSR"

References

1904 births
1978 deaths
Burials at Novodevichy Cemetery
Soviet military personnel
People's commissars and ministers of the Soviet Union